Stupid Young Heart is a 2018 Finnish drama film directed by Selma Vilhunen. It was screened in the Contemporary World Cinema section at the 2018 Toronto International Film Festival. It was selected as the Finnish entry for the Best International Feature Film at the 92nd Academy Awards, but it was not nominated.

Plot
Pregnant teen Kiira and her boyfriend Lenni struggle to make ends meet. Further complications arise when Lenni joins a group of neo-Nazis.

Cast
 Pihla Viitala as Ansku
 Ville Haapasalo as Janne
 Katja Kukkola as Satu

Reception
Barry Hertz from The Globe and Mail gave the film 2.5 out of 4, stating: "With Stupid Young Heart, director Selma Vilhunen attempts to dissect the attraction a fringe group might offer for the youthful and dispossessed, and while her intentions are noble, the execution is as shaky as the current geopolitical environment." Michael McNeely from "That Shelf" said: "Limited characterization and a static plot prevent the film from soaring." 

Michelle da Silva from the newspaper NOW Toronto liked the film giving it 4 stars out of five, describing it as "much more than a teen romance" and writing: "Vilhunen explores real hardships of the working class, and her portrayal of teens is heartbreakingly authentic. Honkonen and Ristseppä give sensitive performances that will haunt you after the final scene." For The Canadian Press, David Friend said, "while 'Stupid Young Heart' ties up a complicated story too easily, it draws some light to how fringe groups find weakness and exploit it for their own agenda."

See also
 List of submissions to the 92nd Academy Awards for Best International Feature Film
 List of Finnish submissions for the Academy Award for Best International Feature Film

References

External links
 

2018 films
2018 drama films
2010s pregnancy films
Finnish drama films
2010s Finnish-language films
Films about neo-Nazism
Teenage pregnancy in film
Works about white nationalism